Conceição is a freguesia ("civil parish") in the district of Ribeira Grande in the Azores. The population in 2011 was 2,425, in an area of 12.73 km². It is situated on the north coast of the island. Together with the parish Matriz, it forms the old core of the town Ribeira Grande. It contains the localities Caldeiras and Conceição.

References

Parishes of Ribeira Grande, Azores